Dean James is the name of:

L. Dean James, American writer
Dean James (footballer), Dutch footballer